ARA Almirante Brown (pennant number D-10) is the lead ship of the MEKO 360H2 series of four destroyers built for the Argentine Navy. The ship is the ninth ship in the history of the Argentine Navy to be named for Admiral William Brown, the founder and commander of the Argentine Navy during Argentina's war of independence against Spain.

Construction

The keel of Almirante Brown was laid down on September 8, 1980, and she was launched on March 28, 1981. The ship was delivered to the Argentine Navy on February 2, 1983, for her sea trials, following which the ship departed for Argentina, arriving at Puerto Belgrano Naval Base on March 21 and being formally commissioned into the Navy on March 28 of that same year.

Service history
Almirante Brown, together with the corvette , was ordered to proceed to the Persian Gulf on September 25, 1990, as part of the United Nations-mandated naval blockade on Iraq following its invasion of Kuwait. The ship formed part of the multinational task force and participated on Operations Desert Shield and Desert Storm, returning to Argentina on April 25, 1991.

On April 16, 1996, Almirante Brown conducted the first trans-horizon launch of an Exocet MM-40 missile in the Argentine Navy.

Her home port is Puerto Belgrano, where the class of four ships form part of the Navy's 2nd Destroyer Division.

References

Bibliography
 Guia de los buques de la Armada Argentina 2005-2006. Ignacio Amendolara Bourdette, Editor n/a. (Spanish/English text)

 

Almirante Brown-class destroyers
Ships built in Hamburg
1981 ships
Destroyers of Argentina
Gulf War ships of Argentina